The governor of Camarines Norte is the local chief executive and head of the Provincial Government of Camarines Norte in the Philippines. Along with the governors of Albay, Camarines Sur, Catanduanes, Masbate, andSorsogon, the province's chief executive is a member of the Regional Development Council of the Bicol Region.

List of governors of Camarines Norte

References

Governors of Camarines Norte
Governors of provinces of the Philippines